This is a list of Swedish scientists.

Archaeology 
 Lili Kaelas (1919–2007), Stone and Bronze Age archaeologist

Biology and environmental science 
 Albertina Carlsson (1848–1930), zoologist
Augusta Christie-Linde (1870–1953), zoologist
Jonas C. Dryander (1748–1810), botanist      
Eva Ekeblad (1724–1786), agronomist
Erik Leonard Ekman (1883–1931), botanist
Elias Magnus Fries (1794–1878), botanist
AnnMari Jansson (1934–2007), systems ecologist
Pehr Kalm (1716–1779), botanist
Carl Linnaeus (1707–1778), botanist, "father of taxonomy"
René Malaise (1892–1978), entomologist
Lisbeth Olsson (1963–), professor in industrial biotechnology
Johan Rockström (1965–), professor in environmental science and executive director of the Stockholm Resilience Centre
Olaus Rudbeckius, junior (1660–1740), botanist
Daniel Solander (1733–1782), botanist
Peter Gustaf Tengmalm (1754–1803), naturalist

Chemistry 
Johan August Arfwedson (1792–1841), chemist
Svante Arrhenius (1859–1927), chemist and physicist
Karin Aurivillius (1920–1982), chemist and crystallographer
Jöns Jacob Berzelius (1779–1848), chemist
Lars Ernster (1920–1998), biochemistry, member of the Board of the Nobel Foundation
Christina Lampe-Önnerud (1967–), chemist
Alfred Nobel (1833–1896), chemist and founder of the Nobel Prizes 
Carl Wilhelm Scheele (1742–1786), chemist
Theodor Svedberg (1884–1971), chemist

Computer science and numerical analysis 
Björn Engquist (1945–), numerical analysis
Johan Håstad (1960–), theoretical computer science
Laila Ohlgren (1937–2014), telecommunications

Engineering 
Nils Alwall (1904–86), inventor and engineer
Arne Asplund (1903–1993), inventor and engineer
Karl Johan Åström (1934–), engineer, control theorist
Nils Bohlin (1920–2002), inventor and engineer
Marianne Kärrholm (1921–2018), chemical engineer and professor
Ingrid Bruce (1940–2012), engineer and trade unionist
Gustaf Dalén (1869–1937), inventor and engineer
Rune Elmqvist (1906–1996), inventor and engineer
John Ericsson (1803–1889), inventor and engineer
Lars Magnus Ericsson (1846–1926), inventor and engineer
Carl Edvard Johansson (1864–1943), inventor and engineer
Johan Petter Johansson (1864–1943), inventor and engineer
Håkan Lans (1947–), inventor and engineer
Gustaf de Laval (1845–1913), inventor and engineer
Frans Wilhelm Lindqvist (1862–1931), inventor and engineer
Carl Rickard Nyberg (1858–1939), inventor and engineer
Gustaf Erik Pasch (1788–1862), inventor and engineer
Baltzar von Platen (1898–1984), inventor and engineer
Erik Wallenberg (1915–1999), inventor and engineer
Waloddi Weibull (1887–1979), material scientist
Jonas Wenström (1855–1893), inventor and engineer
Sven Wingquist (1876–1953), inventor and engineer
Lars Bern (1942–), engineer

Geology and geography 
 Arne Bjerhammar (1917–2011), geodesy
 Torsten Hägerstrand (1916–2004), geography
 Adolf Erik Nordenskiöld (1832–1901), geology, Arctic explorer
 Otto Nordenskiöld (6 December 1869 – 1928), geology, explorer

Mathematics 
Albert Victor Bäcklund (1845–1922)
Arne Beurling (1905–1986), analysis
Lennart Carleson (1928–), analysis
Per Enflo (1944–), analysis
Sture Eskilsson (1930–2016), economist
Erik Ivar Fredholm (1866–1927), analysis
Olle Häggström (1967–), mathematical statistics
Lars Hörmander (1931–2012), analysis
Helge von Koch (1870–1924), analysis
Sonja Kovalevskaya (1850–1891), analysis, partial differential equations
Anders Martin-Löf (1940–), analysis and mathematical physics
Per Martin-Löf (1942–), logic, statistics, and computer science
Gösta Mittag-Leffler (1846–1927), analysis

Medicine 
Arvid Carlsson (1923–2018), neuroscientist
Ulf von Euler (1905–1983), physiologist and pharmacologist
Björn Folkow (1921–2012), physiologist
Allvar Gullstrand (1862–1930), medicine
Olaus Rudbeckius (1630–1702), medicine
Ellen Sandelin (1862–1907) practicing physician in Stockholm, who received her medical license in 1897
Stina Stenhagen (1916–1973), medical biochemist
Hugo Theorell (1903–1982), medicine

Physics and astronomy 
Hannes Alfvén (1908–1995), physicist
Anders Jonas Ångström (1814–1874), physicist
Oskar Backlund (1846–1916), astronomer
Anders Celsius (1701–1744), astronomer
Bengt Edlén (1906–1993), physicist
V. Walfrid Ekman (1874–1954), physical oceanographer
Oskar Klein (1894–1977), physicist
Per-Olov Löwdin (1916–2000), physicist
Knut Lundmark (1889–1958), astronomer
Lise Meitner (1878–1968), nuclear physicist
Christopher Polhem (1661–1751), physicist
Carl-Gustaf Rossby (1898–1957), meteorologist
Janne Rydberg (1854–1919), physicist
Manne Siegbahn (1886–1978), physicist
Kai Siegbahn (1918–2007), physicist
Rolf Maximilian Sievert (1896-1966), medical physicist
Karin Öberg (1982–), astrochemist

Social sciences 
 Pär-Erik Back (1920–1988), social scientist
 Alvar Ellegård (1919–2008), linguistics, confessional beliefs
 Phebe Fjellström (1924–2007), ethnologist
 Orvar Löfgren (1943–), ethnologist
 Margareta Wahlström (born 1950), senior UN official

Statistics and data science
Harald Cramér (1893–1985), mathematical statistics
Ulf Grenander (1923–2016), stochastic processes and pattern recognition
Karl Gustav Jöreskog (1935–), multivariate analysis
Olav Kallenberg (1939–), probability
Gunnar Kulldorff (1927–2015), estimation and survey sampling
Herman Wold (1908–1992), econometrics and time series analysis

See also 
 Nobel Prize
 Royal Swedish Academy of Sciences

 
Swedish
Scientists